Bostian Heights is an unincorporated community in Rowan County, North Carolina, United States.

The John Stigerwalt House, which is listed on the National Register of Historic Places, is located near Bostian Heights.

References

Unincorporated communities in Rowan County, North Carolina
Unincorporated communities in North Carolina